The Life and Death of Peter Sellers is a 2004 television film about the life of English comedian Peter Sellers, based on Roger Lewis's book of the same name. It was directed by Stephen Hopkins and stars Geoffrey Rush as Sellers, Miriam Margolyes as his mother Peg Sellers, Emily Watson as his first wife Anne Howe, Charlize Theron as his second wife Britt Ekland, John Lithgow as Blake Edwards, Stephen Fry as Maurice Woodruff and Stanley Tucci as Stanley Kubrick.

The film won the Golden Globe Award for Best Miniseries or Television Film and Rush won Best Actor – Miniseries or Television Film. It also won nine Primetime Emmy Awards, including Outstanding Lead Actor in a Miniseries or Movie for Rush.

Plot 
The film opens with Peter Sellers walking up to a director's chair. An unseen live audience applauds as Peter directs their gaze toward the movie of his life.

In 1950s London, Peter Sellers is a household name as a performer on The Goon Show but is failing to branch out into film. He returns home to his family after a failed audition but is urged by his controlling mother Peg (Miriam Margolyes) to "bite the hand that feeds you". A now inspired Peter utilizes his talent for impersonation to disguise himself as the elderly war veteran character he was auditioning for. Once the casting agent (Alison Steadman) has divulged that he is perfect for the role, Peter reveals himself and is reluctantly given the part.

Peter wins a British Academy Award for I'm All Right Jack. Peg and Peter's father, Bill (Peter Vaughan), watch their son's acceptance speech but dismissed by Peg, a dejected Bill walks away leading to the first transformation of the film; Peter is now playing his father, and with a heavy Yorkshire accent breaks the fourth wall to tell us about Peter's childhood.

Before the shooting of The Millionairess has begun, Peter is already besotted with his co-star Sophia Loren (Sonia Aquino), while his marriage to wife Anne (Emily Watson) is becoming strained and his children are subjected to their father's rages and subsequent extravagant gifts as compensation. When Sophia mentions that Peter is too far away in the countryside to take her home, he takes this as a cue to buy a house in the heart of London. To subdue some of the guilt Peter feels about his feelings for Sophia, he hires a decorator, Ted Levy, and insists that his wife and Ted should have drinks together. Peter leaves them and goes to have dinner alone with Sophia, who is surprised that Peter's wife is not joining them and slowly realises that this is a date. She rejects Peter's advances and tells him to go home to his family. Peter does so and announces his love for Sophia Loren to Anne and their two children.

Seeing Carlo Ponti (Joseph Long) has come to visit his wife Sophia on set, Sellers distracts himself with Sophia's stand-in and the two have sex in Peter's Rolls-Royce. Meanwhile, a weary Anne surrenders to quietly spending the night with Ted. Once Peter returns home and realises his wife has left, he wreaks havoc in the house. Anne comes home the morning after to find Peter on the balcony threatening to jump if she leaves. The two argue and Anne walks out. We then see Peter's second transformation, this time in drag as Anne, who is dubbing the breakup to make it look as though they had reconciled.

Peter returns home to Peg's care to recuperate after the divorce and begins to see Maurice Woodruff (Stephen Fry), a clairvoyant to the stars, hoping to gain some direction; Woodruff's influence leads him to the Pink Panther series.

On a flight to Italy, he sees a pack of Captain Webb matches, which inspires the physical appearance of Inspector Clouseau. Filming of The Pink Panther begins and his portrayal is a huge success, but Peter is disappointed with the final product and blames Blake Edwards (John Lithgow).

Peter returns to England to find his father on life support, which Peg had been keeping from him. After Bill has stated how proud he is of his son, he dies. Peter is heartbroken and cannot forgive Peg for not calling him; their close bond is irreversibly severed and Peter leaves.

At The Dorchester Hotel, Peter is taking a woman back to his room but is interrupted by Stanley Kubrick (Stanley Tucci), who has come to persuade Peter to be in his new film, Dr. Strangelove. Peg comes to visit Peter on-set, but Peter decides to stay in character as the titular scientist to avoid confronting reality. Peg is unsettled and eventually leaves, feeling as though she had not truly seen her son.

While Stanley and Peter are discussing the fourth character he is due to play, Peter grows aggravated about his workload, insisting he will not play the American bomber pilot. After he storms off, we watch the third change; Peter becomes Stanley, who turns to look at us with the Kubrick stare and tells us that Peter Sellers was not a person, simply a vessel, “but even an empty vessel can become too full”. Peter's way out of playing Major Kong is by showing up to set with crutches and pretending he had injured himself getting out of a taxi.

Meanwhile, Maurice Woodruff is taking a bribe to convince Peter into doing another Pink Panther film. He informs Peter that a very special partnership involves the initials B.E., meaning Blake Edwards. Peter instead pursues his new neighbour Britt Ekland (Charlize Theron). He asks her to be his date to the cinema where they see Dr Strangelove. They wed just 10 days after meeting.While on their honeymoon in Hollywood, Peter inhales amyl nitrites during sex, causing him to have a series of eight heart attacks. He is rushed to the hospital and Peg watches the breaking news of Peter's critical condition from her home in England being broadcast on “both channels”. During the resuscitation, a dream sequence takes place in Peter's consciousness with his many characters surrounding him, before he notices that he has a ticking bomb attached to his chest. When he wakes, he believes himself to now be invincible.
Peter's next film is Casino Royale, but with his new lease of life he wants to play it straight, much to the dismay of everyone involved. He abandons the film after no one takes him seriously.

Britt informs Peter that she has fallen pregnant, but is met with an unimpressed Peter, who doesn't want more children. However, Britt insists on keeping the baby. Once the baby is born, Peter and Britt's relationship becomes strained and they fight as the newborn interrupts scenes of After The Fox.

In costume as the blue matador for The Bobo, Peter receives a call from Peg, where she tells Peter that she is in hospital and that she needs to see him. However, Peter pretends to be called away and hangs up. The fourth narrative change is Peter becoming Peg, who defends Peter's behaviour, just as the real Peg always did. As Peg, he climbs into a coffin before reverting to himself. Peter is distraught at Peg's funeral and Britt tries to comfort him, but he instead cries on his first wife Anne's shoulder.

When they get home, Peter antagonizes Britt while she is trying to comfort him. A physical fight ensues and Britt smashes a picture of Peg over Peter's head. She leaves for good, taking their daughter with her, and Peter is alone with his thoughts, triggering a psychedelic sequence which swiftly takes Peter through the 70's.

During one of their sessions, Maurice Woodruff listens to Peter talk about his obsession with Being There, a book Peter loves so much that he wants it to be his next film, but Maurice uses the spirit of Peg to persuade Peter to instead do The Pink Panther Strikes Again and a superstitious Peter relents.

At the screening for the film, a drunken Peter gives a speech which becomes more and more uninhibited until he abruptly leaves. Watching his home movies alone, Peter gets a voicemail from his now adult son Michael, who wishes him well with his new pacemaker. Once the recording ends, Peter looks to the table beside him and opens the script for Revenge of the Pink Panther. In costume as the "old salty Swedish sea dog", Peter collapses in his trailer while an unaware Blake bangs at his door. The fifth and final transformation is Peter into Blake Edwards, who tells us what it is like to work with the "difficult" but "mesmerizing" Peter Sellers.

The only project Peter never gave up on was Being There. Scenes of Peter carefully constructing the main character in his home are interspersed with him destroying his own memorabilia, including some of his own home movies. Peter is exasperated that he can not find the look of Chance, but meditates on the memory of his lowly father. This allows Peter to not rely on a comical accent or costume, but to instead channel his still and simple father.

Peter quietly rewatches scenes from Being There, proud of something he made. A tired and visibly prematurely ageing Peter walks through the Swiss snow to meet with Blake Edwards, who has the script for The Romance of the Pink Panther. Instead of entering, Peter hesitates and watches through the window, eventually turning to stand motionless under a streetlight. Blake comes out, confused to find Peter standing perfectly still. They do not share a word and Blake kisses Peter on the cheek, eventually leaving him alone. Facts about the final years of Sellers' life are shown over the motionless Peter in the snow.

The film finishes with the same version of Peter that we saw at the start. The movie about his life has now ended. He sits in the director's chair and shrugs, stands up and walks through the film's set pieces, surrounded by bustling crew, to his trailer and smiles to the camera, "You can't come in here."

Cast

Production

The role of Sellers was portrayed by Geoffrey Rush, "who approached the role with the enthusiasm of a hungry child in a candy store", notes a reviewer. Rush impersonates most of the important characters that Sellers played in his film career. Director Blake Edwards is played by John Lithgow, and the film exposes some of the behind-the-scenes personality conflicts between Sellers and Edwards, which contributed to their unhappy and tumultuous working relationship, despite the success of their films. In the interview for the film, included on the DVD, Edwards credited Rush with portraying Sellers' characters with uncanny similarity to the real Peter Sellers, and in 2004 claimed that it was the best acting he had ever seen Rush perform.

Rush stated in interviews that the film was itself structured to be reminiscent of a Peter Sellers film. However, it was darker than Sellers' actual films since it depicted Sellers' troubled experiences in his life (including his tantrums and mental instability). This included at various times Rush (as Sellers) dressing up to play other characters in his life (several were ultimately edited out, but are included within the special features on the DVD). In these instances he broke the fourth wall to give a monologue to the audience.

Roger Lewis: "It was the melancholia of Sellers I was drawn to; all those shuffling little ghostly figures he used to play in Boulting brothers films, or Clouseau, with those soulful, mournful brown eyes. For all the success and the women, he is rather a lonely and melancholic figure. And that is what redeems him." Hollywood was immediately interested in adapting Lewis's biography. In the mid-1990s Madonna's company Maverick bought the rights, but the Sellers project did not get off the ground. Many different writers worked on the screenplay, among them Lee Hall; eventually the writers Christopher Markus and Stephen McFeely came up with a script to tell the story. Director Stephen Hopkins ultimately distanced himself from Lewis's book, and said he was inspired by Sellers's 16mm home movies, which were featured in a 1995 BBC Arena documentary, "The Peter Sellers Story", directed by Peter Lydon.

Release
Although intended as a television production, the film was given a limited theatrical release in the United Kingdom and was also theatrically released in a number of other countries including Spain, Italy, Iceland, Ireland, New Zealand and Australia. The film achieved its highest theatrical success in Australia, earning over US$1 million at the box office.

Reception
On Rotten Tomatoes the film has an approval rating of 69% based on reviews from 26 critics. The site's critics consensus states: "The Life and Death of Peter Sellers struggles to truly capture its subject's singular genius, but remains a diverting tribute -- and a showcase for the talents of Geoffrey Rush."

The Belfast Telegraph notes how the film captured Sellers's "life of drugs, drink, fast cars and lots and lots of beautiful women". 
Todd McCarthy of Variety wrote: "Sustains interest most of the way, but combination of an unsympathetic central figure and patchy recreation of events involving numerous famous people makes for an ambitiously told life story that finally doesn't cut it."

Accolades

References

External links
 
 

2004 films
British comedy-drama films
British biographical films
BBC Film films
2004 comedy-drama films
Films about filmmaking
Biographical films about actors
Films shot in England
Films based on biographies
Films directed by Stephen Hopkins
HBO Films films
Best Miniseries or Television Movie Golden Globe winners
Films with screenplays by Christopher Markus and Stephen McFeely
American comedy-drama films
Cultural depictions of Stanley Kubrick
Peter Sellers
2000s American films
2000s British films